Atafu, formerly known as the Duke of York Group, is a group of 52 coral islets within Tokelau in the south Pacific Ocean,  north of Samoa.

Population
According to the 2016 census, 541 people officially live on Atafu (although only 413 were present the night the census was taken). Of those present, 78% belong to the Congregational Church. The main settlement on the atoll is located on Atafu Island in its northwestern corner. The Presbyterian church was established on the island in 1858, but today almost all of the residents belong to the Congregational Christian Church. The first village on Atafu was established at its southern end: Residents built houses along the lagoon shore to take best advantage of the cooling trade winds.

Fishing is traditionally done by the men on Atafu, and they are highly skilled at it. They use many traditional methods that are passed on from fathers to sons. They create very effective lures, fish traps, nets, and seines. They commonly use the technique called "noose fishing", in which a circle of rope, tied with a noose knot, is dangled in the water; a large fish swims into the rope circle, lured by bait, and the noose is then tightened around its body, holding it fast. They also make well-crafted canoes, which they use for their fishing expeditions.

Geography

Atafu lies in the Pacific hurricane belt. In January 1914, a massive storm demolished the church and most of the houses on the islands, and wiped out many of the coconut palms.

Lizards, rats, and seabirds are common on Atafu island. The atoll attracts a wide variety of fish in large numbers.

The eastern side of the lagoon is a nearly continuous thin strip of land with one small break halfway along its length. In contrast, the western side is composed of reef and several distinct islands, notably the inverted V shape of Atafu Island in the north, Alofi, which extends into the lagoon from the western reef, and the L-shaped Fenualoa in the southwest. The smaller Tamaseko Island lies in the lagoon close to Alofi.

The reef which connects the islands of the atoll is shallow enough that it is possible to walk between the islands at low tide. This also means that there is no boat passage to the lagoon, although the ocean becomes deep very close to the reef. This allows for good anchorage, but also makes for rough seas close to the reef. The flatness of the atoll and its location within the tropical cyclone belt has led to damage to island properties on occasion.

Important Bird Area
Some 70 ha of the southern and south-western parts of the atoll have been designated an Important Bird Area (IBA) by BirdLife International because the site supports breeding colonies of brown and black noddiess and common white terns, with about 30,000 breeding pairs estimated in 2011.

Islets 

 Fogalaki i Lalo
 Fogalaki-Matangi (Fogalaki i Matagi)
 Te Oki
 Te Hepu
 Laualalava
 Te Kapi
 Na Utua
 Motu Atea
 Motu Fakalalo
 Tama Hakea
 Hakea Lahi ki Matagi
 Hakea O Himi
 Malatea
 Kenakena
 Malo o Futa
 Motu o Te Lakia
 Komulo
 Hakea o Apelamo
 Na Hapiti
 Niuefa
 Fenualoa
 Te Puka 
 Tamaheko
 Te Alofi
 Tulua a Kovi
 Tagi a Kuli
 Hakea o Himi
 Tulua a Kava
 Motu o te Niu
 Malatea
 Hakea o Hoi
 Hakea o Fata
 Kenakena
 Matu o Tenumi
 Matu o te Lakia
 Motu Fakaka kai
 Malo o Futa
 Malo o Futa
 Motu o te Fala
 Tafega
 Komulo
 Hakela Lahi i Lalo
 Hotoma
 Hakea o Apelamo
 Na Hapiti
 Niuefa
 Fenualoa
 Te Puka
 Tamaheko
 Te Alofi
 Ulugagie
 Atafu Village

History

It is likely that Polynesians visited the island in ancient times, but they may not have settled there. Byron found no one living on the island at that time. He named the island "Duke of York's island". Atafu was established  by a man named Tonuia and his wife named Lagimaina, along with their seven children.

Between 1856 and 1979, the United States claimed sovereignty over the island and the other Tokelauan atolls. In 1979, the U.S. conceded that Tokelau was now under New Zealand sovereignty, and a maritime boundary between Tokelau and American Samoa was established by the Treaty of Tokehega.

On 26 August 2007, Ralph Tuijn, who was attempting to row a boat from South America to Australia, crash-landed on Atafu. On 26 November 2010, three teenage boys from Atafu were rescued after having drifted   for 50 days in the Pacific.

See also
 List of Guano Island claims

References

External links

History and map
Satellite image

 
Atolls of Tokelau
Pacific islands claimed under the Guano Islands Act
Territorial disputes of New Zealand
Former disputed islands
Important Bird Areas of the Tokelau Islands
Seabird colonies
Important Bird Areas of the Realm of New Zealand